Speculative may refer to:

In arts and entertainment
Speculative art (disambiguation)
Speculative fiction, which includes elements created out of human imagination, such as the science fiction and fantasy genres
Speculative Fiction Group, a Persian literature group whose website which is named Fantasy Academy
Speculative poetry, a genre of poetry that focuses on fantastic, science fictional and mythological themes
Speculative screenplay, or spec script, a non-commissioned, unsolicited screenplay
The Speculative Society, a Scottish Enlightenment society dedicated to public speaking and literary composition, founded in 1764

In computing
Speculative execution, in computer systems is doing work, the result of which may not be needed. This performance optimization technique is used in pipelined processors and other systems
Speculative multithreading, a dynamic parallelization technique that depends on out-of-order execution to achieve speedup on multiprocessor CPUs. It is a kind of speculative execution that occurs at the thread level as opposed to the instruction level

In economics
Speculation, the practice of engaging in risky transactions in an attempt to profit from fluctuations in market value
Speculative attack, denoting precipitous acquisition of assets by previously inactive speculators
Speculative demand, a demand for financial assets that is not dictated by real transactions such as trade or financing
Speculative development, in real estate
Speculative grade, a grade of bond below investment grade, having higher risk, but typically pay higher yield than better quality bonds
Economic bubble, when assets trade at a price that far exceeds an asset's intrinsic value due to speculation

In linguistics
Speculative mood, a grammatical mood found in some languages
Speculative grammarians, members of a school of grammarian philosophy known as Modism, active in Europe in the 13th and 14th centuries
Speculative Grammarian, a parody science journal

In philosophy
Speculative philosophy, an aspect of Continental philosophy
Speculative realism, a movement in contemporary philosophy
Speculative reason, theoretical as opposed to practical thought

Other uses
Speculative damages, in law, damages claimed by a plaintiff for losses that may occur in the future
Speculative fire, a military tactic of firing to draw enemy fire and confirm the enemy's presence
Speculative mason, in Freemasonry
Speculative Period, defined in terms of archaeological methods employed in North America between 1492 and 1840

See also
Speculation (disambiguation)